In mathematics, a numerical semigroup is a special kind of a semigroup. Its underlying set is the set of all nonnegative integers except a finite number  and the binary operation is the operation of  addition of integers. Also, the integer 0 must be an element of the semigroup. For example, while the set {0, 2, 3, 4, 5, 6, ...} is a numerical semigroup, the set {0, 1, 3, 5, 6, ...} is not because 1 is in the set and 1 + 1 = 2 is not in the set. Numerical semigroups are commutative monoids and are also known as numerical monoids.

The definition of numerical semigroup is intimately related to the problem of determining nonnegative integers that can be expressed in the form x1n1 + x2 n2 + ... + xr nr for a given set {n1, n2, ..., nr} of positive integers and for arbitrary nonnegative integers x1, x2, ..., xr. This problem had been considered by several mathematicians like Frobenius (1849–1917) and Sylvester (1814–1897) at the end of the 19th century. During the second half of the twentieth century, interest in the study of numerical semigroups resurfaced because of their applications in algebraic geometry.

Definition and examples

Definition 

Let N be the set of nonnegative integers. A subset S of N is called a numerical semigroup if the following conditions are satisfied.

0 is an element of S
N − S, the complement of S in N, is finite.
If x and y are in S then x + y is also in S.

There is a simple method to construct numerical semigroups. Let A = {n1, n2, ..., nr} be a nonempty set of positive integers. The set of all integers of the form x1 n1 + x2 n2 + ... + xr nr is the subset of N generated by A and is denoted by 〈 A 〉. The following theorem fully characterizes numerical semigroups.

Theorem 

Let S be the subsemigroup of N generated by A. Then S is a numerical semigroup if and only if gcd (A) = 1. Moreover, every numerical semigroup arises in this way.

Examples 

The following subsets of N are numerical semigroups.
〈 1 〉 = {0, 1, 2, 3, ...}
〈 1, 2 〉 = {0, 1, 2, 3, ...}
〈 2, 3 〉 = {0, 2, 3, 4, 5, 6, ...}
Let a be a positive integer. 〈 a, a + 1, a + 2, ... , 2a – 1  〉 = {0, a, a + 1, a + 2, a + 3, ...}.
Let b be an odd integer greater than 1. Then 〈 2, b 〉 = {0, 2, 4, . . . , b − 3 , b − 1, b, b + 1, b + 2, b + 3 , ...}.
Well-tempered harmonic semigroup H={0,12,19,24,28,31,34,36,38,40,42,43,45,46,47,48,...}

Embedding dimension, multiplicity 

The set A is a set of generators of the numerical semigroup 〈 A 〉. A set of generators of a numerical semigroup is a minimal system
of generators if none of its proper subsets generates the numerical semigroup. It is known that
every numerical semigroup S has a unique minimal system of generators and also that this minimal system of generators is finite. The cardinality of the minimal set of generators is called the embedding dimension of the numerical semigroup S and is denoted by e(S). The smallest member in the minimal system of generators is called the multiplicity of the numerical semigroup S and is denoted by m(S).

Frobenius number and genus 
There are several notable numbers associated with a numerical semigroup S.
 The set N − S is called the set of gaps in S and is denoted by G(S).
 The number of elements in the set of gaps G(S) is called the genus of S (or, the degree of singularity of S) and is denoted by g(S).
 The greatest element in G(S) is called the Frobenius number of S and is denoted by F(S).
 The smallest element of S such that all larger integers are likewise elements of S is called the conductor; it is F(S) + 1.

Examples 

Let S =  〈 5, 7, 9 〉. Then we have:
 The set of elements in S :  S = {0, 5, 7, 9, 10, 12, 14, ...}.
 The minimal set of generators of S : {5, 7, 9}.
 The embedding dimension of S : e(S) = 3.
 The multiplicity of S : m(S) = 5.
 The set of gaps in S : G(S) = {1, 2, 3, 4, 6, 8, 11, 13}.
 The Frobenius number of S is F(S) = 13, and its conductor is 14.
 The genus of S : g(S) = 8.

Numerical semigroups  with small Frobenius number or genus

Computation of Frobenius number

Numerical semigroups with embedding dimension two 

The following general results were known to Sylvester.  Let a and b be positive integers such that gcd (a, b) = 1. Then
F(〈 a, b 〉) = (a − 1) (b − 1) − 1 = ab − (a + b).
g(〈 a, b 〉) =  (a − 1)(b − 1) / 2.

Numerical semigroups with embedding dimension three 

There is no known general formula to compute the Frobenius number of numerical semigroups having embedding dimension three or more. No polynomial formula can be found to compute the Frobenius number or genus of a numerical semigroup with embedding dimension three. Every positive integer is the Frobenius number of some numerical semigroup with embedding dimension three.

Rödseth's algorithm 

The following algorithm, known as Rödseth's algorithm,

can be used to compute the Frobenius number of a numerical semigroup S generated by {a1, a2, a3} where  a1 < a2 < a3   and       gcd ( a1, a2, a3) = 1.  Its worst-case complexity is not as good as Greenberg's algorithm

but it is much simpler to describe.
Let s0 be the unique integer such that a2s0 ≡ a3 mod a1, 0 ≤ s0 < a1.
The continued fraction algorithm is applied to the ratio a1/s0:
a1 = q1s0 − s1, 0 ≤ s1 < s0,
s0 = q2s1 − s2, 0 ≤ s2 < s1,
s1 = q3s2 − s3, 0 ≤ s3 < s2,
...
sm−1 = qm+1sm,
sm+1 = 0,
where qi ≥ 2, si ≥ 0 for all i.
Let p−1 = 0, p0 = 1, pi+1 = qi+1pi − pi−1 and ri = (sia2 − pia3)/a1.
Let v be the unique integer number such that rv+1 ≤ 0 < rv, or equivalently, the unique integer such
sv+1/pv+1 ≤ a3/a2 <  sv/pv·
Then, F(S) = −a1 + a2(sv − 1) + a3(pv+1 − 1) − min{a2sv+1, a3pv}.

Special classes of numerical semigroups 
An irreducible numerical semigroup is a numerical semigroup  such that it cannot be written as the intersection of two numerical semigroups properly containing it. A numerical semigroup S is irreducible if and only if S is maximal, with respect to set inclusion,  in the collection of all numerical semigroups  with Frobenius number F(S).

A numerical semigroup S  is symmetric if it is irreducible and its Frobenius number F(S) is  odd.  We say that S is pseudo-symmetric provided that S is irreducible and F(S) is even. Such numerical semigroups have simple characterizations in terms of Frobenius number and genus:
A numerical semigroup S is symmetric if and only if g(S) = (F(S) + 1)/2.
A numerical semigroup S is pseudo-symmetric if and only if g(S) = (F(S) + 2)/2.

See also 
Frobenius number
Special classes of semigroups
Semigroup
Sylver coinage

References 

Semigroup theory
Algebraic structures
Number theory